A macrolanguage is a book-keeping mechanism for the ISO 639 international standard of language codes. Macrolanguages are established to assist mapping between different sets of ISO language codes. Specifically, there may be a many-to-one correspondence between ISO 639-3, intended to identify all the thousands of languages of the world, and either of two other sets, ISO 639-1, established to identify languages in computer systems, and ISO 639-2, which encodes a few hundred languages for library cataloguing and bibliographic purposes. When such many-to-one ISO 639-2 codes are included in an ISO 639-3 context, they are called "macrolanguages" to distinguish them from the corresponding individual languages of ISO 639-3. According to the ISO, 

ISO 639-3 is curated by SIL International, ISO 639-2 is curated by the Library of Congress (USA).

The mapping often has the implication that it covers borderline cases where two language varieties may be considered strongly divergent dialects of the same language or very closely related languages (dialect continuums); it may also encompass situations when there are language varieties that are considered to be varieties of the same language on the grounds of ethnic, cultural, and political considerations, rather than linguistic reasons. However, this is not its primary function and the classification is not evenly applied.

For example, Chinese is a macrolanguage encompassing many languages that are not mutually intelligible, but the languages "Standard German", "Bavarian German", and other closely related languages do not form a macrolanguage, despite being more mutually intelligible. Other examples include Tajiki not being part of the Persian macrolanguage despite sharing much lexicon, and Urdu and Hindi not forming a macrolanguage despite forming a mutually intelligible dialect continuum. Even all dialects of Hindi are considered as separate languages.  Basically, ISO 639-2 and ISO 639-3 use different criteria for dividing language varieties into languages, 639-2 uses shared writing systems and literature more whereas 639-3 focuses on mutual intelligibility and shared lexicon. The macrolanguages exist within the ISO 639-3 code set to make mapping between the two sets easier.

The use of macrolanguages was applied in Ethnologue, starting in the 16th edition. , there are fifty-eight language codes in ISO 639-2 that are counted as macrolanguages in ISO 639-3, but new macrolanguages are no longer being created, as current databases are sufficient to indicated the relationships between codes. 

Some of the macrolanguages had no individual language (as defined by 639-3) in ISO 639-2, e.g. "ara" (Arabic), but ISO 639-3 recognizes different varieties of Arabic as separate languages under some circumstances.  Others, like "nor" (Norwegian) had their two individual parts (nno Nynorsk, nob Bokmål) already in 639-2. That means some languages (e.g. "arb" Standard Arabic) that were considered by ISO 639-2 to be dialects of one language ("ara") are now in ISO 639-3 in certain contexts considered to be individual languages themselves. This is an attempt to deal with varieties that may be linguistically distinct from each other, but are treated by their speakers as forms of the same language, e.g. in cases of diglossia. For example,

 Generic Arabic, 639-2
 Standard Arabic, 639-3

ISO 639-2 also includes codes for collections of languages; these are not the same as macrolanguages. These collections of languages are excluded from ISO 639-3, because they never refer to individual languages. Most such codes are included in ISO 639-5.

Types of macrolanguages

 elements that have no ISO 639-2 code: 4 (bnc, hbs, kln, luy)
 elements that have no ISO 639-1 code: 29
 elements that do have ISO 639-1 codes: 33
 elements whose individual languages have ISO 639-1 codes: 4
 aka – tw
 hbs – bs, hr, sr
 msa – id
 nor – nb, nn

List of macrolanguages
This list only includes official data from https://iso639-3.sil.org/code_tables/macrolanguage_mappings/data.

List of macrolanguages and the individual languages
This is a complete list of the individual language codes that comprise the macrolanguages in the ISO 639-3 code tables .

aaa–ezz

aka
aka is the ISO 639-3 language code for Akan. Its ISO 639-1 code is ak. There are two individual language codes assigned:
 fat – Fanti
 twi – Twi

ara
ara is the ISO 639-3 language code for Arabic. Its ISO 639-1 code is ar. There are twenty-nine individual language codes assigned:
 aao – Algerian Saharan Arabic
 abh – Tajiki Arabic
 abv – Baharna Arabic
 acm – Mesopotamian Arabic
 acq – Ta'izzi-Adeni Arabic
 acw – Hijazi Arabic
 acx – Omani Arabic
 acy – Cypriot Arabic
 adf – Dhofari Arabic
 aeb – Tunisian Arabic
 aec – Saidi Arabic
 afb – Gulf Arabic
 apc – Levantine Arabic
 apd – Sudanese Arabic
 arb – Standard Arabic
 arq – Algerian Arabic
 ars – Najdi Arabic
 ary – Moroccan Arabic
 arz – Egyptian Arabic
 auz – Uzbeki Arabic
 avl – Eastern Egyptian Bedawi Arabic
 ayh – Hadrami Arabic
 ayl – Libyan Arabic
 ayn – Sanaani Arabic
 ayp – North Mesopotamian Arabic
 pga – Sudanese Creole Arabic
 shu – Chadian Arabic
 ssh – Shihhi Arabic

The following codes were previously part of ara:
 ajp – South Levantine Arabic (merged with apc (formerly for the North one) to be a single Levantine Arabic)
 bbz – Babalia Creole Arabic (Non-existent; Code retired 23 January 2020)

aym
aym is the ISO 639-3 language code for Aymara. Its ISO 639-1 code is ay. There are two individual language codes assigned:
 ayc – Southern Aymara
 ayr – Central Aymara

aze
aze is the ISO 639-3 language code for Azerbaijani. Its ISO 639-1 code is az. There are two individual language codes assigned:
 azb – South Azerbaijani
 azj – North Azerbaijani

bal
bal is the ISO 639-3 language code for Baluchi. There are three individual language codes assigned:
 bcc – Southern Balochi
 bgn – Western Balochi
 bgp – Eastern Balochi

bik
bik is the ISO 639-3 language code for Bikol. There are eight individual language codes assigned:
 bcl – Central Bikol
 bln – Southern Catanduanes Bikol
 bto – Rinconada Bikol
 cts – Northern Catanduanes Bikol
 fbl – West Albay Bikol
 lbl – Libon Bikol
 rbl – Miraya Bikol
 ubl – Buhi'non Bikol

The following code was previously part of bik:
 bhk – Albay Bicolano (Split into Buhi'non Bikol [ubl], Libon Bikol [lbl], Miraya Bikol [rbl], and West Albay Bikol [fbl] on 18 January 2010)

bnc

bnc is the ISO 639-3 language code for Bontok. There are five individual language codes assigned:

 ebk – Eastern Bontok
 lbk – Central Bontok
 obk – Southern Bontok
 rbk – Northern Bontok
 vbk – Southwestern Bontok

bua
bua is the ISO 639-3 language code for Buriat. There are three individual language codes assigned:
 bxm – Mongolia Buriat
 bxr – Russia Buriat
 bxu – China Buriat

chm
chm is the ISO 639-3 language code for Mari, a language located in Russia. There are two individual language codes assigned:
 mhr – Eastern Mari
 mrj – Western Mari

cre
cre is the ISO 639-3 language code for Cree. Its ISO 639-1 code is cr. There are six individual language codes assigned:
 crj – Southern East Cree
 crk – Plains Cree
 crl – Northern East Cree
 crm – Moose Cree
 csw – Swampy Cree
 cwd – Woods Cree

In addition, there are six closely associated individual codes:
 nsk – Naskapi (part of the Cree language group but not included under the cre macrolanguage designation)
 moe – Montagnais (part of the Cree language group but not included under the cre macrolanguage designation)
 atj – Atikamekw (part of the Cree language group but not included under the cre macrolanguage designation)
 crg – Michif language (Cree-French mixed language with strong influences from Ojibwe language group and not included under the cre macrolanguage designation)
 ojs – Ojibwa, Severn (Ojibwa, Northern) (part of the Ojibwa language group with strong influences from the Cree language group and not included under the cre macrolanguage designation)
 ojw – Ojibwa, Western (part of the Ojibwa language group with strong influences from the Cree language group and not included under the cre macrolanguage designation)

In addition, there is one other language without individual codes closely associated, but not part of, this macrolanguage code:
 Bungee language (mixed language of Cree, Ojibwa, French, English, Assiniboine and Scottish Gaelic)

del
del is the ISO 639-3 language code for Delaware. There are two individual language codes assigned:
 umu – Munsee
 unm – Unami

den
den is the ISO 639-3 language code for Slave. There are two individual language codes assigned:
 scs – North Slavey
 xsl – South Slavey

din
din is the ISO 639-3 language code for Dinka. There are five individual language codes assigned:
 dib – South Central Dinka
 dik – Southwestern Dinka
 dip – Northeastern Dinka
 diw – Northwestern Dinka
 dks – Southeastern Dinka

doi
doi is the ISO 639-3 language code for Dogri. There are two individual language codes assigned:
 dgo – Dogri (individual language)
 xnr – Kangri

est
est is the ISO 639-3 language code for Estonian. Its ISO 639-1 code is et. There are two individual language codes assigned:
 ekk – Standard Estonian
 vro – Võro

faa–jzz

fas
fas is the ISO 639-3 language code for Persian. Its ISO 639-1 code is fa. There are two individual language codes assigned:
 pes – Iranian Persian
 prs – Dari

ful
ful is the ISO 639-2 and ISO 639-3 language code for Fulah (also spelled Fula). Its ISO 639-1 code is ff. There are nine individual language codes assigned for varieties of Fulah:
 ffm – Maasina Fulfulde
 fub – Adamawa Fulfulde
 fuc – Pulaar
 fue – Borgu Fulfulde
 fuf – Pular
 fuh – Western Niger Fulfulde
 fui – Bagirmi Fulfulde
 fuq – Central-Eastern Niger Fulfulde
 fuv – Nigerian Fulfulde

gba
gba is the ISO 639-3 language code for Gbaya located in the Central African Republic. There are six individual language codes assigned:
 bdt – Bokoto
 gbp – Gbaya-Bossangoa
 gbq – Gbaya-Bozoum
 gmm – Gbaya-Mbodomo
 gso – Southwest Gbaya
 gya – Northwest Gbaya

The following code was previously part of gba:
 mdo – Southwest Gbaya (Split into Southwest Gbaya [gso] (new identifier) and Gbaya-Mbodomo [gmm] on 14 January 2008)

gon
gon is the ISO 639-3 language code for Gondi. There are three individual language codes assigned:
 esg – Aheri Gondi
 gno – Northern Gondi
 wsg – Adilabad Gondi

The following code was previously part of gon:
 ggo – Southern Gondi (Split into [esg] Aheri Gondi and [wsg] Adilabad Gondi on 15 January 2016)

grb
grb is the ISO 639-3 language code for Grebo. There are five individual language codes assigned:
 gbo – Northern Grebo
 gec – Gboloo Grebo
 grj – Southern Grebo
 grv – Central Grebo
 gry – Barclayville Grebo

grn
grn is the ISO 639-3 language code for Guarani. Its ISO 639-1 code is gn. There are five individual language codes assigned:
 gnw – Western Bolivian Guaraní
 gug – Paraguayan Guaraní
 gui – Eastern Bolivian Guaraní
 gun – Mbyá Guaraní
 nhd – Chiripá

hai
hai is the ISO 639-3 language code for Haida. There are two individual language codes assigned:
 hax – Southern Haida
 hdn – Northern Haida

hbs
hbs is the ISO 639-3 language code for Serbo-Croatian. There are four individual language codes assigned:
 bos – Bosnian
 cnr – Montenegrin
 hrv – Croatian
 srp – Serbian

hmn
hmn is the ISO 639-3 language code for Hmong. There are twenty-five individual language codes assigned:
 cqd – Chuanqiandian Cluster Miao
 hea – Northern Qiandong Miao
 hma – Southern Mashan Hmong
 hmc – Central Huishui Hmong
 hmd – Large Flowery Miao
 hme – Eastern Huishui Hmong
 hmg – Southwestern Guiyang Hmong
 hmh – Southwestern Huishui Hmong
 hmi – Northern Huishui Hmong
 hmj – Ge
 hml – Luopohe Hmong
 hmm – Central Mashan Hmong
 hmp – Northern Mashan Hmong
 hmq – Eastern Qiandong Miao
 hms – Southern Qiandong Miao
 hmw – Western Mashan Hmong
 hmy – Southern Guiyang Hmong
 hmz – Hmong Shua
 hnj – Hmong Njua
 hrm – Horned Miao
 huj – Northern Guiyang Hmong
 mmr – Western Xiangxi Miao
 muq – Eastern Xiangxi Miao
 mww – Hmong Daw
 sfm – Small Flowery Miao

The following code was previously part of hmn:
 blu – Hmong Njua (Split into Hmong Njua [hnj] (new identifier), Chuanqiandian Cluster Miao [cqd], Horned Miao [hrm], and Small Flowery Miao [sfm] on 14 January 2008)

iku
iku is the ISO 639-3 language code for Inuktitut. Its ISO 639-1 code is iu. There are two individual language codes assigned:
 ike – Eastern Canadian Inuktitut
 ikt – Inuinnaqtun

ipk
ipk is the ISO 639-3 language code for Inupiaq. Its ISO 639-1 code is ik. There are two individual language codes assigned:
 esi – North Alaskan Inupiatun
 esk – Northwest Alaska Inupiatun

jrb
jrb is the ISO 639-3 language code for Judeo-Arabic. There are four individual language codes assigned:
 aju – Judeo-Moroccan Arabic
 jye – Judeo-Yemeni Arabic
 yhd – Judeo-Iraqi Arabic
 yud – Judeo-Tripolitanian Arabic

The following code was previously part of jrb:
 ajt – Judeo-Tunisian Arabic (Merged into Tunisian Arabic [aeb] on 20 January 2022)

kaa–ozz

kau
kau is the ISO 639-2 and ISO 639-3 language code for the Kanuri. Its ISO 639-1 code is kr. There are three individual language codes assigned in ISO 639-3 for varieties of Kanuri:
 kby – Manga Kanuri
 knc – Central Kanuri
 krt – Tumari Kanuri

There are two other related languages that are not considered part of the macrolanguage under ISO 639:
 bms – Bilma Kanuri
 kbl – Kanembu

kln
kln is the ISO 639-3 language code for Kalenjin. There are nine individual language codes assigned:
 enb – Markweeta
 eyo – Keiyo
 niq – Nandi
 oki – Okiek
 pko – Pökoot
 sgc – Kipsigis
 spy – Sabaot
 tec – Terik
 tuy – Tugen

kok
kok is the ISO 639-3 language code for Konkani (macrolanguage). There are two individual language codes assigned:
 gom – Goan Konkani
 knn – Konkani (individual language)

Both languages are referred to as Konkani by their respective speakers.

kom
kom is the ISO 639-3 language code for Komi. Its ISO 639-1 code is kv. There are two individual language codes assigned:
 koi – Komi-Permyak
 kpv – Komi-Zyrian

kon
kon is the ISO 639-3 language code for Kongo. Its ISO 639-1 code is kg. There are three individual language codes assigned:
 kng – Koongo
 kwy – San Salvador Kongo
 ldi – Laari

kpe
kpe is the ISO 639-3 language code for Kpelle. There are two individual language codes assigned:
 gkp – Guinea Kpelle
 xpe – Liberia Kpelle

kur
kur is the ISO 639-3 language code for Kurdish. Its ISO 639-1 code is ku. There are three individual language codes assigned:
 ckb – Central Kurdish
 kmr – Northern Kurdish
 sdh – Southern Kurdish

lah
lah is the ISO 639-3 language code for Lahnda. There are seven individual language codes assigned.
 hnd – Southern Hindko
 hno – Northern Hindko
 jat – Jakati
 phr – Pahari-Potwari
 pnb – Western Panjabi
 skr – Saraiki
 xhe – Khetrani
Note that lah does not include Panjabi/Punjabi (pan).

The following code was previously part of lah:
 pmu – Mirpur Panjabi (Moved to code "phr" on 12 January 2015)

lav
lav is the ISO 639-3 language code for Latvian. Its ISO 639-1 code is lv. There are two individual language codes assigned:

 ltg – Latgalian
 lvs – Standard Latvian

luy
luy is the ISO 639-3 language code for Luyia. There are fourteen individual language codes assigned:
 bxk – Bukusu
 ida – Idakho-Isukha-Tiriki
 lkb – Kabras
 lko – Khayo
 lks – Kisa
 lri – Marachi
 lrm – Marama
 lsm – Saamia
 lto – Tsotso
 lts – Tachoni
 lwg – Wanga
 nle – East Nyala
 nyd – Nyore
 rag – Logooli

man
man is the ISO 639-3 language code for Mandingo. There are six individual language codes assigned:
 emk – Eastern Maninkakan
 mku – Konyanka Maninka
 mlq – Western Maninkakan
 mnk – Mandinka
 msc – Sankaran Maninka
 mwk – Kita Maninkakan

The following codes were previously part of man:
 myq – Forest Maninka (Non-existent; Code retired 23 January 2013)

mlg
mlg is the ISO 639-3 language code for Malagasy. Its ISO 639-1 code is mg. There are eleven individual language codes assigned:
 bhr – Bara Malagasy
 bmm – Northern Betsimisaraka Malagasy
 bzc – Southern Betsimisaraka Malagasy
 msh – Masikoro Malagasy
 plt – Plateau Malagasy
 skg – Sakalava Malagasy
 tdx – Tandroy-Mahafaly Malagasy
 tkg – Tesaka Malagasy
 txy – Tanosy Malagasy
 xmv – Antankarana Malagasy
 xmw – Tsimihety Malagasy

The following codes were previously part of mlg:
 bjq – Southern Betsimisaraka Malagasy (Split into Southern Betsimisaraka [bzc] and Tesaka Malagasy [tkg] on 18 May 2011)

mon
mon is the ISO 639-3 language code for Mongolian. Its ISO 639-1 code is mn. There are two individual language codes assigned:
 khk – Halh Mongolian
 mvf – Peripheral Mongolian

msa
msa is the ISO 639-3 language code for Malay (macrolanguage). Its ISO 639-1 code is ms. There are thirty-six individual language codes assigned:
 bjn – Banjar
 btj – Bacanese Malay
 bve – Berau Malay
 bvu – Bukit Malay
 coa – Cocos Islands Malay
 dup – Duano
 hji – Haji
 ind – Indonesian
 jak – Jakun
 jax – Jambi Malay
 kvb – Kubu
 kvr – Kerinci
 kxd – Brunei
 lce – Loncong
 lcf – Lubu
 liw – Col
 max – North Moluccan Malay
 meo – Kedah Malay
 mfa – Pattani Malay
 mfb – Bangka
 min – Minangkabau
 mqg – Kota Bangun Kutai Malay
 msi – Sabah Malay
 mui – Musi
 orn – Orang Kanaq
 ors – Orang Seletar
 pel – Pekal
 pse – Central Malay
 tmw – Temuan
 urk – Urak Lawoi'
 vkk – Kaur
 vkt – Tenggarong Kutai Malay
 xmm – Manado Malay
 zlm – Malay (individual language)
 zmi – Negeri Sembilan Malay
 zsm – Standard Malay

The following code was previously part of msa:
 mly – Malay (individual language) (Split into Standard Malay [zsm], Haji [hji], Papuan Malay [pmy], and Malay [zlm] on 18 February 2008)

In addition, there is an individual code not part of this macrolanguage because it is categorized as a historical language:
 omy – Old Malay

mwr
mwr is the ISO 639-3 language code for Marwari. There are six individual language codes assigned:
 dhd – Dhundari
 mtr – Mewari
 mve – Marwari (Pakistan)
 rwr – Marwari (India)
 swv – Shekhawati
 wry – Merwari

nep
nep is the ISO 639-3 language code for Nepali (macrolanguage).  Its ISO 639-1 code is ne.  There are two individual language codes assigned:
 dty – Dotyali
 npi – Nepali (individual language)

nor
nor is the ISO 639-3 language code for Norwegian. Its ISO 639-1 code is no. There are two individual language codes assigned:
 nno – Norwegian Nynorsk
 nob – Norwegian Bokmål

oji

oji is the ISO 639-3 language code for Ojibwa. Its ISO 639-1 code is oj. There are seven individual language codes assigned:
 ciw – Chippewa
 ojb – Northwestern Ojibwa
 ojc – Central Ojibwa
 ojg – Eastern Ojibwa
 ojs – Severn Ojibwa
 ojw – Western Ojibwa
 otw – Ottawa

In addition, there are three closely associated individual codes:
 alq – Algonquin language (part of the Ojibwe language group but not included under the oji macrolanguage designation)
 pot – Potawatomi language (formerly part of the Ojibwe language group and not included under the oji macrolanguage designation)
 crg – Michif language (Cree-French mixed language with strong influences from Ojibwe language group and not included under the oji macrolanguage designation)

In addition, there are two other languages without individual codes closely associated, but not part of, this macrolanguage code:
 Broken Ojibwa (pidgin language used until the end of the 19th century)
 Bungee language (mixed language of Cree, Ojibwa, French, English, Assiniboine and Scottish Gaelic)

ori
ori is the ISO 639-3 language code for Oriya (macrolanguage).  Its ISO 639-1 code is or.  There are two individual language codes assigned:
 ory – Odia
 spv – Sambalpuri

orm
orm is the ISO 639-3 language code for Oromo. Its ISO 639-1 code is om. There are four individual language codes assigned:
 gax – Borana-Arsi-Guji Oromo
 gaz – West Central Oromo
 hae – Eastern Oromo
 orc – Orma

paa–zzz

pus
pus is the ISO 639-3 language code for Pashto. Its ISO 639-1 code is ps. There are three individual language codes assigned:
 pbt – Southern Pashto
 pbu – Northern Pashto
 pst – Central Pashto

que
que is the ISO 639-3 language code for Quechua. Its ISO 639-1 code is qu. There are forty-three individual language codes assigned:
 qub – Huallaga Huánuco Quechua
 qud – Calderón Highland Quichua
 quf – Lambayeque Quechua
 qug – Chimborazo Highland Quichua
 quh – South Bolivian Quechua
 quk – Chachapoyas Quechua
 qul – North Bolivian Quechua
 qup – Southern Pastaza Quechua
 qur – Yanahuanca Pasco Quechua
 qus – Santiago del Estero Quichua
 quw – Tena Lowland Quichua
 qux – Yauyos Quechua
 quy – Ayacucho Quechua
 quz – Cusco Quechua
 qva – Ambo-Pasco Quechua
 qvc – Cajamarca Quechua
 qve – Eastern Apurímac Quechua
 qvh – Huamalíes-Dos de Mayo Huánuco Quechua
 qvi – Imbabura Highland Quichua
 qvj – Loja Highland Quichua
 qvl – Cajatambo North Lima Quechua
 qvm – Margos-Yarowilca-Lauricocha Quechua
 qvn – North Junín Quechua
 qvo – Napo Lowland Quechua
 qvp – Pacaraos Quechua
 qvs – San Martín Quechua
 qvw – Huaylla Wanca Quechua
 qvz – Northern Pastaza Quichua
 qwa – Corongo Ancash Quechua
 qwc – Classical Quechua
 qwh – Huaylas Ancash Quechua
 qws – Sihuas Ancash Quechua
 qxa – Chiquián Ancash Quechua
 qxc – Chincha Quechua
 qxh – Panao Huánuco Quechua
 qxl – Salasaca Highland Quichua
 qxn – Northern Conchucos Ancash Quechua
 qxo – Southern Conchucos Ancash Quechua
 qxp – Puno Quechua
 qxr – Cañar Highland Quichua
 qxt – Santa Ana de Tusi Pasco Quechua
 qxu – Arequipa-La Unión Quechua
 qxw – Jauja Wanca Quechua

The following code was previously part of que:
 cqu – Chilean Quechua (Moved to code "quh" on 15 January 2016)

raj
raj is the ISO 639-3 language code for Rajasthani. There are six individual language codes assigned:
 bgq – Bagri
 gda – Gade Lohar
 gju – Gujari
 hoj – Hadothi
 mup – Malvi
 wbr – Wagdi

rom
rom is the ISO 639-3 language code for Romany. There are seven individual language codes assigned:
 rmc – Carpathian Romani
 rmf – Kalo Finnish Romani
 rml – Baltic Romani
 rmn – Balkan Romani
 rmo – Sinte Romani
 rmw – Welsh Romani
 rmy – Vlax Romani

In addition, there are nine individual codes not part of this macrolanguage but they are categorized as mixed languages:
 emx – Erromintxela
 rge – Romano-Greek
 rmd – Traveller Danish
 rme – Angloromani
 rmg – Traveller Norwegian
 rmi – Lomavren
 rmr – Caló
 rmu – Tavringer Romani
 rsb – Romano-Serbian

sqi
sqi is the ISO 639-3 language code for Albanian. Its ISO 639-1 code is sq. There are four individual language codes assigned:
 aae – Arbëreshë Albanian
 aat – Arvanitika Albanian
 aln – Gheg Albanian
 als – Tosk Albanian

srd
srd is the ISO 639-3 language code for Sardinian. Its ISO 639-1 code is sc. There are four individual language codes assigned:
 sdc – Sassarese Sardinian
 sdn – Gallurese Sardinian
 src – Logudorese Sardinian
 sro – Campidanese Sardinian

swa
swa is the ISO 639-3 language code for Swahili. Its ISO 639-1 code is sw. There are two individual language codes assigned:
 swc – Congo Swahili
 swh – Swahili (individual language)

syr
syr is the ISO 639-3 language code for Syriac. There are two individual language codes assigned:
 aii – Assyrian Neo-Aramaic
 cld – Chaldean Neo-Aramaic

tmh
tmh is the ISO 639-3 language code for Tamashek. There are four individual language codes assigned:
 taq – Tamasheq
 thv – Tahaggart Tamahaq
 thz – Tayart Tamajeq
 ttq – Tawallammat Tamajaq

uzb
uzb is the ISO 639-3 language code for Uzbek. Its ISO 639-1 code is uz. There are two individual language codes assigned:
 uzn – Northern Uzbek
 uzs – Southern Uzbek

yid
yid is the ISO 639-3 language code for Yiddish. Its ISO 639-1 code is yi. There are two individual language codes assigned:
 ydd – Eastern Yiddish
 yih – Western Yiddish

zap
zap is the ISO 639-3 language code for Zapotec. There are fifty-eight individual language codes assigned.
 zaa – Sierra de Juárez Zapotec
 zab – Western Tlacolula Valley Zapotec
 zac – Ocotlán Zapotec
 zad – Cajonos Zapotec
 zae – Yareni Zapotec
 zaf – Ayoquesco Zapotec
 zai – Isthmus Zapotec
 zam – Miahuatlán Zapotec
 zao – Ozolotepec Zapotec
 zaq – Aloápam Zapotec
 zar – Rincón Zapotec
 zas – Santo Domingo Albarradas Zapotec
 zat – Tabaa Zapotec
 zav – Yatzachi Zapotec
 zaw – Mitla Zapotec
 zax – Xadani Zapotec
 zca – Coatecas Altas Zapotec
 zcd – Las Delicias Zapotec
 zoo – Asunción Mixtepec Zapotec
 zpa – Lachiguiri Zapotec
 zpb – Yautepec Zapotec
 zpc – Choapan Zapotec
 zpd – Southeastern Ixtlán Zapotec
 zpe – Petapa Zapotec
 zpf – San Pedro Quiatoni Zapotec
 zpg – Guevea De Humboldt Zapotec
 zph – Totomachapan Zapotec
 zpi – Santa María Quiegolani Zapotec
 zpj – Quiavicuzas Zapotec
 zpk – Tlacolulita Zapotec
 zpl – Lachixío Zapotec
 zpm – Mixtepec Zapotec
 zpn – Santa Inés Yatzechi Zapotec
 zpo – Amatlán Zapotec
 zpp – El Alto Zapotec
 zpq – Zoogocho Zapotec
 zpr – Santiago Xanica Zapotec
 zps – Coatlán Zapotec
 zpt – San Vicente Coatlán Zapotec
 zpu – Yalálag Zapotec
 zpv – Chichicapan Zapotec
 zpw – Zaniza Zapotec
 zpx – San Baltazar Loxicha Zapotec
 zpy – Mazaltepec Zapotec
 zpz – Texmelucan Zapotec
 zsr – Southern Rincon Zapotec
 zte – Elotepec Zapotec
 ztg – Xanaguía Zapotec
 ztl – Lapaguía-Guivini Zapotec
 ztm – San Agustín Mixtepec Zapotec
 ztn – Santa Catarina Albarradas Zapotec
 ztp – Loxicha Zapotec
 ztq – Quioquitani-Quierí Zapotec
 zts – Tilquiapan Zapotec
 ztt – Tejalapan Zapotec
 ztu – Güilá Zapotec
 ztx – Zaachila Zapotec
 zty – Yatee Zapotec

The following codes were previously part of zap:
 ztc – Lachirioag Zapotec (Moved to Yatee Zapotec [zty] on 18 July 2007)

In addition, there is an individual code not part of this macrolanguage because it is categorized as a historical language:
 xzp – Ancient Zapotec

zha
zha is the ISO 639-3 language code for Zhuang. Its ISO 639-1 code is za. There are sixteen individual language codes assigned:
 zch – Central Hongshuihe Zhuang
 zeh – Eastern Hongshuihe Zhuang
 zgb – Guibei Zhuang
 zgm – Minz Zhuang
 zgn – Guibian Zhuang
 zhd – Dai Zhuang
 zhn – Nong Zhuang
 zlj – Liujiang Zhuang
 zln – Lianshan Zhuang
 zlq – Liuqian Zhuang
 zqe – Qiubei Zhuang
 zyb – Yongbei Zhuang
 zyg – Yang Zhuang
 zyj – Youjiang Zhuang
 zyn – Yongnan Zhuang
 zzj – Zuojiang Zhuang

The following codes were previously part of zha:
 ccx – Northern Zhuang (Split into Guibian Zh [zgn], Liujiang Zh [zlj], Qiubei Zh [zqe], Guibei Zh [zgb], Youjiang Zh [zyj], Central Hongshuihe Zh [zch], Eastern Hongshuihe Zh [zeh], Liuqian Zh [zlq], Yongbei Zh [zyb], and Lianshan Zh [zln]. on 14 January 2008)
 ccy – Southern Zhuang (Split into Nong Zhuang [zhn],  Yang Zhuang [zyg], Yongnan Zhuang [zyn], Zuojiang Zhuang [zzj], and Dai Zhuang [zhd] on 18 July 2007)

zho

zho is the ISO 639-3 language code for Chinese. Its ISO 639-1 code is zh. There are sixteen individual language codes assigned, most of which are not actually languages but rather groups of Sinitic languages distinguished by isoglosses:
 cdo – Min Dong Chinese
 cjy – Jinyu Chinese
 cmn – Mandarin Chinese
 cnp – Northern Ping Chinese
 cpx – Pu-Xian Chinese
 csp – Southern Ping Chinese
 czh – Huizhou Chinese
 czo – Min Zhong Chinese
 gan – Gan Chinese
 hak – Hakka Chinese
 hsn – Xiang Chinese
 lzh – Literary Chinese
 mnp – Min Bei Chinese
 nan – Min Nan Chinese
 wuu – Wu Chinese
 yue – Yue Chinese

Although the Dungan language (dng) is a dialect of Mandarin, it is not listed under Chinese in ISO 639-3 due to separate historical and cultural development.

ISO 639 also lists codes for Old Chinese (och) and Late Middle Chinese (ltc)). They are not listed under Chinese in ISO 639-3 because they are categorized as ancient and historical languages, respectively.

zza
zza is the ISO 639-3 language code for Zaza. There are two individual language codes assigned:
 diq – Dimli (individual language)
 kiu – Kirmanjki (individual language)

See also
 Microlanguage

References

External links
 ISO 639-3 Macrolanguage Mappings

macrolanguage
Language identifiers
Dialectology